Dangote Cement Plc is a Nigerian publicly-traded multinational cement manufacturer headquartered in Lagos. The company is engaged in the manufacture, preparation, import, packaging, and distribution of cement and related products in Nigeria, and has plants or import terminals in nine other African countries.

History
It was formerly known as Obajana Cement Plc, and changed its name to Dangote Cement Plc in July 2010. Obajana Cement Plc was incorporated in 1992. Dangote Cement Plc is a subsidiary of Dangote Group and is the largest company traded on the Nigerian Stock Exchange.

Dangote Cement listed on the Nigerian Stock Exchange in October 2010, and as at August  2014 accounts for 20% of the total market capitalization of the Exchange. In 2014, the Investment Corporation of Dubai (ICD) purchased a $300 million stake in Dangote Cement.

Aliko Dangote has invested US$6.5 billion into the company between 2007, and 2012. Cement accounted for roughly 80 percent of Dangote Group's business as of 2011.

Operations
The Dangote Cement plant in Obajana, Kogi, is the largest in Sub-Saharan Africa with 
10.25 million tonnes per year capacity across three lines and a further 3 million tonnes per year capacity currently being built. 

In 2012, the firm opened a $1 billion cement plant in Ibese, Ogun.  The facility is capable of producing 6 million metric tonnes of cement per year, raising the company's total production by 40 percent at the time. The plant was installed by the Chinese construction and engineering firm Sinoma, and represents one of the largest non-oil investments in Nigeria. 

The company's plant in Gboko, Benue has 3 million tonnes per year capacity with an upgrade to 4 million tonnes per year planned in 2013. A plant in Senegal along with a plant in Tanzania opened in 2015. That same year, a plant was opened in Ethiopia also, which came under threat of civil unrest in 2017, and civil war in 2021.

References

External links
Official website
Dangote Cement at Bloomberg.
Dangote Cement at BusinessWeek.
Dangote Cement  at Reuters.
Dangote Cement at Financial Times.
Dangote Cement at Forbes Global 2000.

Cement companies of Nigeria
Manufacturing companies based in Lagos
Manufacturing companies established in 1992
Companies listed on the Nigerian Stock Exchange
Nigerian brands
Nigerian companies established in 1992